= Rispark =

- Location within Gauteng Location within South Africa
- Coordinates: 26.316°S 28.049°E
- Country: South Africa
- Province: Gauteng
- Municipality: City of Johannesburg

Area
  - Total: 27.54 km^{2} (10.63 sq mi)

Population (2001)
  - Total: 728
  - Density: 26.4/km^{2} (68.5/sq mi)
- Time zone: UTC+2 (SAST)
- Postal code (street): 2053

Rispark is a suburb (South) of Johannesburg, South Africa. It is located in Region F of the City of Johannesburg Metropolitan Municipality.
